Angle trisection is a classical problem of straightedge and compass construction of ancient Greek mathematics. It concerns construction of an angle equal to one third of a given arbitrary angle, using only two tools: an unmarked straightedge and a compass.

In 1837, Pierre Wantzel proved that the problem, as stated, is impossible to solve for arbitrary angles. However, although there is no way to trisect an angle in general with just a compass and a straightedge, some special angles can be trisected. For example, it is relatively straightforward to trisect a right angle (that is, to construct an angle of measure 30 degrees).

It is possible to trisect an arbitrary angle by using tools other than straightedge and compass. For example, neusis construction, also known to ancient Greeks, involves simultaneous sliding and rotation of a marked straightedge, which cannot be achieved with the original tools. Other techniques were developed by mathematicians over the centuries.

Because it is defined in simple terms, but complex to prove unsolvable, the problem of angle trisection is a frequent subject of pseudomathematical attempts at solution by naive enthusiasts. These "solutions" often involve mistaken interpretations of the rules, or are simply incorrect.

Background and problem statement

Using only an unmarked straightedge and a compass, Greek mathematicians found means to divide a line into an arbitrary set of equal segments, to draw parallel lines, to bisect angles, to construct many polygons, and to construct squares of equal or twice the area of a given polygon.

Three problems proved elusive, specifically, trisecting the angle, doubling the cube, and squaring the circle. The problem of angle trisection reads:

Construct an angle equal to one-third of a given arbitrary angle (or divide it into three equal angles), using only two tools:
 an unmarked straightedge, and
 a compass.

Proof of impossibility 

Pierre Wantzel published a proof of the impossibility of classically trisecting an arbitrary angle in 1837. Wantzel's proof, restated in modern terminology, uses the concept of field extensions, a topic now typically combined with Galois theory. However, Wantzel published these results earlier than Évariste Galois (whose work, written in 1830, was published only in 1846) and did not use the concepts introduced by Galois.

From a solution to one of these two problems, one may pass to a solution of the other by a compass and straightedge construction. The triple-angle formula gives an expression relating the cosines of the original angle and its trisection:  = .

It follows that, given a segment that is defined to have unit length, the problem of angle trisection is equivalent to constructing a segment whose length is the root of a cubic polynomial. This equivalence reduces the original geometric problem to a purely algebraic problem.

Every rational number is constructible. Every irrational number that is  constructible in a single step from some given numbers is a root of a polynomial of degree 2 with coefficients in the field generated by these numbers. Therefore, any number that is constructible by a sequence of steps is a root of a minimal polynomial whose degree is a power of two. The angle  radians (60 degrees, written 60°) is constructible.  The argument below shows that it is impossible to construct a 20° angle. This implies that a 60° angle cannot be trisected, and thus that an arbitrary angle cannot be trisected.

Now let . Note that  =  = . Then by the triple-angle formula,  and so . Thus . Define  to be the polynomial .

Because  has degree 3, if it is reducible over by  then it has a rational root.

So an angle of measure  cannot be trisected.

Angles which can be trisected 
However, some angles can be trisected. For example, for any constructible angle , an angle of measure  can be trivially trisected by ignoring the given angle and directly constructing an angle of measure .  There are angles that are not constructible but are trisectible (despite the one-third angle itself being non-constructible).  For example,  is such an angle: five angles of measure  combine to make an angle of measure , which is a full circle plus the desired .

For a positive integer , an angle of measure  is trisectible if and only if  does not divide .

Algebraic characterization

Theorem: An angle of measure  may be trisected if and only if  is reducible over the field extension  .

The proof is a relatively straightforward generalization of the proof given above that a  angle is not trisectible.

Other numbers of parts

Other methods
The general problem of angle trisection is solvable by using additional tools, and thus going outside of the original Greek framework of compass and straightedge.

Many incorrect methods of trisecting the general angle have been proposed.  Some of these methods provide reasonable approximations; others (some of which are mentioned below) involve tools not permitted in the classical problem.  The mathematician Underwood Dudley has detailed some of these failed attempts in his book The Trisectors.

Approximation by successive bisections
Trisection can be approximated by repetition of the compass and straightedge method for bisecting an angle. The geometric series  or  can be used as a basis for the bisections. An approximation to any degree of accuracy can be obtained in a finite number of steps.

Using origami

Trisection, like many constructions impossible by ruler and compass, can easily be accomplished by the operations of paper folding, or origami. Huzita's axioms (types of folding operations) can construct cubic extensions (cube roots) of given lengths, whereas ruler-and-compass can construct only quadratic extensions (square roots).

Using a linkage

There are a number of simple linkages which can be used to make an instrument to trisect angles including Kempe's Trisector and Sylvester's Link Fan or Isoklinostat.

With a right triangular ruler 

In 1932, Ludwig Bieberbach published in Journal für die reine und angewandte Mathematik his work Zur Lehre von den kubischen Konstruktionen. He states therein (free translation):

"As is known ... every cubic construction can be traced back to the trisection of the angle and to the multiplication of the cube, that is, the extraction of the third root. I need only to show how these two classical tasks can be solved by means of the right angle hook."

This line can be drawn either by using again the right triangular ruler, or by using a traditional straightedge and compass construction.

On the other hand, the triangle  is isosceles, since all radiuses of a circle are equal; this implies that  One has also  since these two angles are alternate angles of a transversal to two parallel lines. This proves the second desired equality, and thus the correctness of the construction.

With an auxiliary curve
There are certain curves called trisectrices which, if drawn on the plane using other methods, can be used to trisect arbitrary angles.  Examples include the trisectrix of Colin Maclaurin, given in Cartesian coordinates by the implicit equation

and the Archimedean spiral.  The spiral can, in fact, be used to divide an angle into any number of equal parts.
Archimedes described how to trisect an angle using the Archimedean spiral in On Spirals around 225 BC.

With a marked ruler
Another means to trisect an arbitrary angle by a "small" step outside the Greek framework is via a ruler with two marks a set distance apart. The next construction is originally due to Archimedes, called a Neusis construction, i.e., that uses tools other than an un-marked straightedge.  The diagrams we use show this construction for an acute angle, but it indeed works for any angle up to 180 degrees.

This requires three facts from geometry (at right):
 Any full set of angles on a straight line add to 180°,
 The sum of angles of any triangle is 180°, and,
 Any two equal sides of an isosceles triangle will meet the third side at the same angle.

Let  be the horizontal line in the adjacent diagram. Angle  (left of point ) is the subject of trisection. A circle of radius  is drawn. While keeping the ruler (but not the mark) touching , the ruler is slid and rotated until one mark is on the circle and the other is on the line . The mark on the circle is labeled  and the mark on the line is labeled . This ensures that .

Conclusion: angle .

Proof:
 From Fact 1) above, °.
 Looking at triangle BCD, from Fact 2) °.
 From the last two equations, .
 From Fact 2), °, thus °, so from last, °.
 From Fact 1) above, °, thus °°.

Again, this construction stepped outside the framework of allowed constructions by using a marked straightedge.

With a string
Thomas Hutcheson published an article in the Mathematics Teacher that used a string instead of a compass and straight edge. A string can be used as either a straight edge (by stretching it) or a compass (by fixing one point and identifying another), but can also wrap around a cylinder, the key to Hutcheson's solution.

Hutcheson constructed a cylinder from the angle to be trisected by drawing an arc across the angle, completing it as a circle, and constructing from that circle a cylinder on which a, say, equilateral triangle was inscribed (a 360-degree angle divided in three). This was then "mapped" onto the angle to be trisected, with a simple proof of similar triangles.

With a "tomahawk"

A "tomahawk" is a geometric shape consisting of a semicircle and two orthogonal line segments, such that the length of the shorter segment is equal to the circle radius. Trisection is executed by leaning the end of the tomahawk's shorter segment on one ray, the circle's edge on the other, so that the "handle" (longer segment) crosses the angle's vertex; the trisection line runs between the vertex and the center of the semicircle.

While a tomahawk is constructible with compass and straightedge, it is not generally possible to construct a tomahawk in any desired position.  Thus, the above construction does not contradict the nontrisectibility of angles with ruler and compass alone.

The tomahawk produces the same geometric effect as the paper-folding method: the distance between circle center and the tip of the shorter segment is twice the distance of the radius, which is guaranteed to contact the angle.  It is also equivalent to the use of an architects L-Ruler (Carpenter's Square).

With interconnected compasses

An angle can be trisected with a device that is essentially a four-pronged version of a compass, with linkages between the prongs designed to keep the three angles between adjacent prongs equal.

Uses of angle trisection

A cubic equation with real coefficients can be solved geometrically with compass, straightedge, and an angle trisector if and only if it has three real roots.

A regular polygon with n sides can be constructed with ruler, compass, and angle trisector if and only if  where r, s, k ≥ 0 and where the pi are distinct primes greater than 3 of the form  (i.e. Pierpont primes greater than 3).

See also
Bisection
Constructible number
Constructible polygon
Euclidean geometry
History of geometry
Morley's trisector theorem
Quadratrix
Trisectrix
Geometric cryptography

References

Further reading
Courant, Richard, Herbert Robbins, Ian Stewart, What is mathematics?: an elementary approach to ideas and methods, Oxford University Press US, 1996. .

External links
MathWorld site
Geometric problems of antiquity, including angle trisection
Some history
One link of marked ruler construction
Another, mentioning Archimedes
A long article with many approximations & means going outside the Greek framework
Geometry site

Other means of trisection
 Approximate angle trisection as an animation, max. error of the angle ≈ ±4E-8°
Trisecting via (Archived 2009-10-25) the limacon of Pascal; see also Trisectrix
Trisecting via an Archimedean Spiral
Trisecting via the Conchoid of Nicomedes
sciencenews.org site on using origami
Hyperbolic trisection and the spectrum of regular polygons

Unsolvable puzzles
Articles containing proofs
History of geometry
Compass and straightedge constructions